Corporate titles or business titles are given to corporate officers to show what duties and responsibilities they have in the organization. Such titles are used by publicly and privately held for-profit corporations, cooperatives, non-profit organizations, educational institutions, partnerships, and sole proprietorships also confer corporate titles.

Variations

There are considerable variations in the composition and responsibilities of corporate title.

Within the corporate office or corporate center of a corporation, some corporations have a chairman and chief executive officer (CEO) as the top-ranking executive, while the number two is the president and chief operating officer  (COO); other corporations have a president and CEO but no official deputy. Typically, senior managers are "higher" than vice presidents, although many times a senior officer may also hold a vice president title, such as executive vice president and chief financial officer (CFO). The board of directors is technically not part of management itself, although its chairman may be considered part of the corporate office if he or she is an executive chairman.

A corporation often consists of different businesses, whose senior executives report directly to the CEO or COO, but that depends on the form of the business. If organized as a division then the top manager is often known as an executive vice president (EVP). If that business is a subsidiary which has considerably more independence, then the title might be chairman and CEO.

In many countries, particularly in Europe and Asia, there is a separate executive board for day-to-day business and supervisory board (elected by shareholders) for control purposes. In these countries, the CEO presides over the executive board and the chairman presides over the supervisory board, and these two roles will always be held by different people. This ensures a distinction between management by the executive board and governance by the supervisory board. This seemingly allows for clear lines of authority. There is a strong parallel here with the structure of government, which tends to separate the political cabinet from the management civil service.

In the United States and other countries that follow a single-board corporate structure, the board of directors (elected by the shareholders) is often equivalent to the European or Asian supervisory board, while the functions of the executive board may be vested either in the board of directors or in a separate committee, which may be called an operating committee (J.P. Morgan Chase), management committee (Goldman Sachs), executive committee (Lehman Brothers), executive council (Hewlett-Packard), or executive board (HeiG) composed of the division/subsidiary heads and senior officers that report directly to the CEO.

United States

State laws in the United States traditionally required certain positions to be created within every corporation, such as president, secretary and treasurer. Today, the approach under the Model Business Corporation Act, which is employed in many states, is to grant corporations discretion in determining which titles to have, with the only mandated organ being the board of directors.

Some states that do not employ the MBCA continue to require that certain offices be established. Under the law of Delaware, where most large US corporations are established, stock certificates must be signed by two officers with titles specified by law (e.g. a president and secretary or a president and treasurer). Every corporation incorporated in California must have a chairman of the board or a president (or both), as well as a secretary and a chief financial officer.

Limited liability company (LLC)-structured companies are generally run directly by their members, but the members can agree to appoint officers such as a CEO or to appoint "managers" to operate the company.

American companies are generally led by a CEO. In some companies, the CEO also has the title of "president". In other companies, a president is a different person, and the primary duties of the two positions are defined in the company's bylaws (or the laws of the governing legal jurisdiction). Many companies also have a CFO, a chief operating officer (COO) and other senior positions such as chief legal officer (CLO), chief strategy officer (CSO), chief marketing officer (CMO), etc. that report to the president and CEO. The next level, which are not executive positions, is middle management and may be called "vice presidents", "directors" or "managers", depending on the size and required managerial depth of the company.

United Kingdom

In British English, the title of managing director is generally synonymous with that of chief executive officer. Managing directors do not have any particular authority under the Companies Act in the UK, but do have implied authority based on the general understanding of what their position entails, as well as any authority expressly delegated by the board of directors.

Japan and South Korea

In Japan, corporate titles are roughly standardized across companies and organizations; although there is variation from company to company, corporate titles within a company are always consistent, and the large companies in Japan generally follow the same outline. These titles are the formal titles that are used on business cards. Korean corporate titles are similar to those of Japan.

Legally, Japanese and Korean companies are only required to have a board of directors with at least one representative director. In Japanese, a company director is called a torishimariyaku (取締役) and a representative director is called a daihyō torishimariyaku (代表取締役). The equivalent Korean titles are isa (이사, 理事) and daepyo-isa (대표이사, 代表理事). These titles are often combined with lower titles, e.g. senmu torishimariyaku or jōmu torishimariyaku for Japanese executives who are also board members. Most Japanese companies also have statutory auditors, who operate alongside the board of directors in supervisory roles.

Under the commercial code in Japan, Jugyōin (従業員) meaning the "employee", is different from Kaishain (会社員), meaning the "stockholders".

The typical structure of executive titles in large companies includes the following:

{| class="wikitable"
!English gloss
!Hanja
!Korean
!Comments
|-
|Chairman
|会長
(會長)
|Hoejang(회장)
|Often a semi-retired president or company founder. Denotes a position with considerable power within the company exercised through behind-the-scenes influence via the active president.
|-
|Vice chairman
|副会長
(副會長)
|Bu-hoejang(부회장)
|At Korean family-owned chaebol companies such as Samsung, the vice-chairman commonly holds the CEO title (i.e., vice chairman and CEO)
|-
|President
|社長
|Sajang(사장)
|Often CEO of the corporation. Some companies do not have the "chairman" position, in which case the "president" is the top position that is equally respected and authoritative.
|-
|Deputy president
or senior executive vice president
|副社長
|Bu-sajang(부사장)
|Reports to the president
|-
|Executive vice president
|専務
|Jŏnmu(전무)
|
|-
|Senior vice president
|常務
|Sangmu(상무)
|
|-
|Vice president
or general manager
or department head
|部長
|Bujang(부장)
|Highest non-executive title; denotes a head of a division or department. There is significant variation in the official English translation used by different companies.
|-
|Deputy general manager
|次長
|Chajang(차장)
|Direct subordinate to bujang
|-
|Manager
or section head
|課長
|Gwajang(과장)
|Denotes a head of a team or section underneath a larger division or department
|-
|Assistant manager
or team leader
|係長
(代理)
|Daeri'''(대리)
|
|-
|Staff
|社員
|Sawon(사원)
|Staff without managerial titles are often referred to without using a title at all
|}

The top management group, comprising jomu/sangmu and above, is often referred to collectively as "cadre" or "senior management" (幹部 or 重役; kambu or juyaku in Japanese; ganbu or jungyŏk in Korean).

Some Japanese and Korean companies have also adopted American-style titles, but these are not yet widespread and their usage varies. For example, although there is a Korean translation for "chief operating officer" (최고운영책임자, choego unyŏng chaegimja), not many companies have yet adopted it with the exception of a few multi-national companies such as Samsung and CJ (a spin-off from Samsung), while the CFO title is often used alongside other titles such as bu-sajang (SEVP) or Jŏnmu (EVP).

Since the late 1990s, many Japanese companies have introduced the title of shikkō yakuin (執行役員) or 'officer', seeking to emulate the separation of directors and officers found in American companies. In 2002, the statutory title of shikkō yaku (執行役) was introduced for use in companies that introduced a three-committee structure in their board of directors. The titles are frequently given to buchō and higher-level personnel. Although the two titles are very similar in intent and usage, there are several legal distinctions: shikkō yaku make their own decisions in the course of performing work delegated to them by the board of directors, and are considered managers of the company rather than employees, with a legal status similar to that of directors. Shikkō yakuin are considered employees of the company that follow the decisions of the board of directors, although in some cases directors may have the shikkō yakuin title as well.

Senior management 

The highest-level executives in senior management usually have titles beginning with "chief" and ending with "officer", forming what is often called the "C-suite", or "CxO", where "x" is a variable that could be any functional area (not to be confused with CXO). The traditional three such officers are CEO, COO, and CFO. Depending on the management structure, titles may exist instead of, or be blended/overlapped with, other traditional executive titles, such as president, various designations of vice presidents (e.g. VP of marketing), and general managers or directors of various divisions (such as director of marketing); the latter may or may not imply membership of the board of directors.

Certain other prominent positions have emerged, some of which are sector-specific. For example, chief audit executive (CAE), chief procurement officer (CPO) and chief risk officer (CRO) positions are often found in many types of financial services companies. Technology companies of all sorts now tend to have a chief technology officer (CTO) to manage technology development. A chief information officer (CIO) oversees information technology (IT) matters, either in companies that specialize in IT or in any kind of company that relies on it for supporting infrastructure.

Many companies now also have a chief marketing officer (CMO), particularly mature companies in competitive sectors, where brand management is a high priority. A chief value officer (CVO) is introduced in companies where business processes and organizational entities are focused on the creation and maximization of value. Approximately 50% of the S&P 500 companies have created a chief strategy officer (CSO) in their top management team to lead strategic planning and manage inorganic growth, which provides a long range perspective versus the tactical view of the COO or CFO. This function often replaces a COO on the C-Suite team, in cases where the company wants to focus on growth rather than efficiency and cost containment. A chief administrative officer (CAO) may be found in many large complex organizations that have various departments or divisions. Additionally, many companies now call their top diversity leadership position the chief diversity officer (CDO). However, this and many other nontraditional and lower-ranking titles are not universally recognized as corporate officers, and they tend to be specific to particular organizational cultures or the preferences of employees.

Specific corporate officer positions 
Chairman of the board – presiding officer of the corporate board of directors. The chairman influences the board of directors, which in turn elects and removes the officers of a corporation and oversees the human, financial, environmental and technical operations of a corporation.
 The CEO may also hold the title of "chairman", resulting in an executive chairman. In this case, the board frequently names an independent member of the board as a lead director. The C-suite is normally led by the CEO.
 Executive chairman – the chairman's post may also exist as an office separate from that of CEO, and it is considered an executive chairman if that titleholder wields influence over company operations, such as Vince McMahon of WWE, Steve Case of AOL Time Warner, and Douglas Flint of HSBC. In particular, the group chairmanship of HSBC is considered the top position of that institution, outranking the chief executive, and is responsible for leading the board and representing the company in meetings with government figures. Prior to the creation of the group management board in 2006, HSBC's chairman essentially held the duties of a chief executive at an equivalent institution, while HSBC's chief executive served as the deputy. After the 2006 reorganization, the management cadre ran the business, while the chairman oversaw the controls of the business through compliance and audit and the direction of the business.
 Non-executive chairman – also a separate post from the CEO, unlike an executive chairman, a non-executive chairman does not interfere in day-to-day company matters. Across the world, many companies have separated the roles of chairman and CEO, often resulting in a non-executive chairman, saying that this move improves corporate governance.
Chief business officer is a corporate senior executive who assumes full management responsibility for the company's deal making, provides leadership and executes a deal strategy that will allow the company to fulfill its scientific/technology mission and build shareholder value, provides managerial guidance to the company's product development staff as needed.
Chief of staff is a corporate director level manager who has overall responsibility for the staff activity within the company who often would have responsibility of hiring and firing of the highest level managers and sometimes directors. They can work with and report directly to managing directors and the chief executive officer.
Commissioner
Financial control officer, FCO or FC, also comptroller or controller – supervises accounting and financial reporting within an organization
 Director or member of a board of directors – high-level official with a fiduciary responsibility of overseeing the operation of a corporation and elects or removes officers of a corporation; nominally, directors, other than the chairman are usually not considered to be employees of the company per se, although they may receive compensation, often including benefits; in publicly held companies. A board of directors is normally made up of members (directors) who are a mixture of corporate officials who are also management employees of the company (inside directors) and persons who are not employed by the company in any capacity (outside directors or non-executive directors). In privately held companies, the board of directors often only consists of the statutory corporate officials, and in sole proprietorship and partnerships, the board is entirely optional, and if it does exist, only operates in an advisory capacity to the owner or partners. Non-profit corporations’ governing board members may be called directors like most for-profit corporations, or an alternative like trustees, governors, etc.
Director – a manager of managers within an organization who is often responsible for a major business function and who sometimes reports to a vice president (note that in some financial services companies the title vice president has a different meaning). Often used with name of a functional area; finance director, director of finance, marketing director, and so on. Not to be confused with a member of the board of directors, who is also referred to as a director. This is a middle management and not an executive level position, unless it is in the banking industry. Alternatively, a manager of managers is often referred to as a "senior manager' or as an "associate vice president", depending upon levels of management, and industry type.
President – legally recognized highest "titled" corporate officer, and usually a member of the board of directors. There is much variation; often the CEO also holds the title of president, while in other organizations if there is a separate CEO, the president is then second highest-ranking position. In such a case the president is often the COO and is considered to be more focused upon daily operations compared to the CEO, who is supposed to be the visionary. If the corporate president is not the COO (such as Richard Parsons of Time Warner from 1995 to 2001), then many division heads report directly to the CEO themselves, with the president taking on special assignments from the CEO.
Secretary or company secretary – legally recognized "titled" corporate officer who reports to the board of directors and is responsible for keeping the records of the board and the company. This title is often concurrently held by the treasurer in a dual position called secretary-treasurer; both positions may be concurrently held by the CFO. Note, however, that the secretary has a reporting line to the board of directors, regardless of any other reporting lines conferred by concurrent titles.
Treasurer – legally recognized corporate officer entrusted with the fiduciary responsibility of caring for company funds. Often this title is held concurrently with that of secretary in a dual role called secretary-treasurer. It can also be held concurrently with the title of CFO or fall under the jurisdiction of one, though the CFO tends to oversee the finance department instead, which deals with accounting and audits, while the treasurer deals directly with company funds. Note, however, that the treasurer has a reporting line to the board of directors, regardless of any other reporting lines conferred by concurrent titles.
Superintendent
Owner (sometimes proprietor or sole proprietor, for sole proprietorships)
Partner – Used in many different ways. This may indicate a co-owner as in a legal partnership or may be used in a general way to refer to a broad class of employees or temporary/contract workers who are often assigned field or customer service work. Associate is often used in a similar way.
 Vice chair or vice chairman – officer of the board of directors who may stand in for the chairman in his or her absence. However, this type of vice chairman title on its own usually has only an advisory role and not an operational one (such as Ted Turner at Time Warner). An unrelated definition of vice chair describes an executive who is higher ranking or has more seniority than executive vice president. Sometimes, EVPs report to the vice chair, who in turn reports directly to the CEO (so vice chairs in effect constitute an additional layer of management), other vice chairs have more responsibilities but are otherwise on an equal tier with EVPs. Executive vice chairman are usually not on the board of directors. Royal Bank of Canada previously used vice chairs in their inner management circle until 2004 but have since renamed them as group heads.

List of chief officer (CO) titles

Middle management
 Supervisor
 Foreman
 General manager or GM
 Manager
 Of counsel – A lawyer working on a part-time or temporary basis for a company or law firm.
 Vice president – Middle or upper manager in a corporation. They often appear in various hierarchical layers such as executive vice president, senior vice president, associate vice president, or assistant vice president, with EVP usually considered the highest and usually reporting to the CEO or president. Many times, corporate officers such as the CFO, COO, CSO, CIO, CTO, secretary, or treasurer will concurrently hold vice president'' titles, commonly EVP or SVP. Vice presidents in small companies are also referred to as chiefs of a certain division, such as vice president for finance, or vice president for administration. Note that in some financial contexts, the title of vice president is actually subordinate to a director.

See also

 Corporate liability
 Identification with corporation
 International Executive Resources Group
 List of corporate titles

References

External links
 Taking Stock - Corporate Execs Get Scammed, Federal Bureau of Investigation

 
Title
.
Corporation-related lists
Lists of occupations
Management occupations
Positions of authority